Bahia Mouhtassine (born 23 August 1979) is a former Moroccan professional tennis player. Her career-high singles ranking is No.139, achieved on 24 June 2002. She is the highest ever ranked player from Morocco.

Biography
Mouhtassine is the first female Moroccan player to feature at the main draw of a Grand Slam tournament. She lost in the first rounds of the 2002 Australian Open and 2003 French Open to Spanish Anabel Medina Garrigues and Czech Zuzana Ondrášková, respectively.

In her career, Mouhtassine won eleven ITF Women's Circuit singles titles and nine doubles titles. She also played on many WTA Tour events, won six gold medals at the Pan Arab Games and one gold at the Mediterranean Games, representing Morocco. Mouthassine's biggest career win was at the Grand Prix SAR La Princesse Lalla Meryem in Casablanca in 2004. She upset third-seeded Katarina Srebotnik, who was ranked 183 spots above her, in straight sets. She has also beaten Sania Mirza at an ITF final in Rabat in 2004.

Bahia retired after losing in the first round of the 2007 Grand Prix SAR La Princesse Lalla Meryem to Vania King.

ITF finals

Singles (11–8)

Doubles (9–7)

National representation

Fed Cup
Mouhtassine made her Fed Cup debut for Morocco in 1995, while the team was competing in the Europe/Africa Zone Group II, when she was 15 years and 259 days old.

Fed Cup (13–7)

Singles (6–1)

* walkover doesn't count in her overall record.

Doubles (7–6)

* walkover doesn't count in her overall record.

References

External links
 
 
 
 http://gulfnews.com/news/gulf/uae/general/after-the-gold-mouhtassine-aims-to-break-into-top-1oo-1.334495
 http://espn.go.com/tennis/player/_/id/744/bahia-mouhtassine

Living people
1979 births
People from Mohammedia
Moroccan female tennis players
Mediterranean Games gold medalists for Morocco
Competitors at the 2001 Mediterranean Games
Mediterranean Games medalists in tennis
21st-century Moroccan women